The Journal of Computer Graphics Techniques is a diamond open-access peer-reviewed scientific journal covering computer graphics. It was established in May 2012 when a large part of the editorial board resigned from the now-defunct Journal of Graphics Tools.  The editor-in-chief is Marc Olano (University of Maryland, Baltimore County).

The Journal of Graphics Tools was a quarterly peer-reviewed scientific journal covering computer graphics. It was established in 1996 and published by A K Peters, now part of Taylor & Francis. From 2009-2011 the journal was published as the Journal of Graphics, GPU, & Game Tools. In 2012, a large part of the editorial board resigned to form the open access Journal of Computer Graphics Techniques. The last editor-in-chief was Francesco Banterle (Istituto di Scienza e Tecnologie dell'Informazione). Previous editors-in-chief have been Andrew Glassner, Ronen Barzel, Doug Roble, and Morgan McGuire. The final volume was released in 2013 and the journal formally ceased with its final issue in 2015.

References

External links 
Journal of Computer Graphics Techniques 
 former Journal of Graphics Tools 

Computer science journals
Publications established in 2012
English-language journals
Publications established in 1996
Quarterly journals
Taylor & Francis academic journals
Publications disestablished in 2015